is a Japanese water polo player. He competed in the men's tournament at the 1964 Summer Olympics.

References

External links
 

1933 births
Living people
Japanese male water polo players
Olympic water polo players of Japan
Water polo players at the 1964 Summer Olympics
Place of birth missing (living people)
Asian Games medalists in water polo
Water polo players at the 1954 Asian Games
Water polo players at the 1958 Asian Games
Water polo players at the 1962 Asian Games
Asian Games gold medalists for Japan
Asian Games silver medalists for Japan
Medalists at the 1954 Asian Games
Medalists at the 1958 Asian Games
Medalists at the 1962 Asian Games
20th-century Japanese people
21st-century Japanese people